Jyotshna Polavarapu (born 22 December 1988) is an Indian badminton player. She plays both doubles and mixed doubles. She partnered Pradnya Gadre earlier for women's doubles events. She was trained at the Gopichand Badminton Academy, and reached the women's doubles number 3 in the national ranking. She was the runners-up at the national championships in the mixed doubles event in 2006/07, and in the women's doubles in 2010/11.

Achievements

BWF International Challenge/Series
Women's doubles

 BWF International Challenge tournament
 BWF International Series tournament

References

External links
 

Indian female badminton players
Living people
1988 births
21st-century Indian women
21st-century Indian people
20th-century Indian women